Alfred Docwra Turner (25 June 1879–1926) was an English footballer who played in the Football League for Bristol City and Nottingham Forest.

References

1879 births
1926 deaths
English footballers
Association football forwards
English Football League players
Watford F.C. players
Upton Park F.C. players
Nottingham Forest F.C. players
Bristol City F.C. players
Bath City F.C. players